Radhamadhab College is a provincialised college located at Silchar, Assam, India, and is affiliated to Assam University. It offers courses in 10+2, undergraduate levels. The college also offers short-term courses to its students.

References

External links
http://www.rmcollege.org/

Silchar
Colleges affiliated to Assam University
Educational institutions established in 1971
1971 establishments in Assam
Universities and colleges in Assam